Eun, also spelled Un, or En, Ehn, Enn, Unn, is an uncommon Korean surname, a single-syllable Korean given name, and an element in many two-syllable Korean given names. As given name meaning differs based on the hanja used to write it. There are 30 hanja with the reading "eun" on the South Korean government's official list of hanja which may be registered for use in given names. The overwhelmingly popular hanja for given name is "(grace)" and "(silver)".

As a Surname

Eun
The 2000 South Korean Census found 15,657 people with this Korean surname. They traced their origins to three different bon-gwan: Yonan County, South Hwanghae and Kangeum, Kumchon County, North Hwanghae in what is today North Korea, and Haengju (행주동), Goyang, Gyeonggi-do in what is today South Korea.

Eun
It is said that the queen of Baekje's chair king is Eungo in 『Japanese clerk』.
Gobu-eun, who is based in Gobu-gun, Jeolla-do, was born in 1784 by Eun Kwang-hoon, born in 1754 He was paid in time-departed radish. Eun Kwang-hoon's residence is Yeongyu, Pyongan-do, Pyeongwon-gun.
In 1930, a national census showed that one family was living in Ssangyong-myeon, Gangseo-gun, South Pyongan.
In the 2015 National Statistical Office Census, there were 13 people with this surname.

People with the surname Eun (殷 or 恩) include:  

Eun Hee-kyung (born 1959), South Korean writer
Eun Ji-won (born 1978), South Korean rapper, member of Sechs Kies

As a Given name
There are 30 hanja with the reading "Eun" on the South Korean government's official list of hanja which may be used in given names. The meaning differs based on the hanja used to write it.
Especially, since the 1970s, a number of given names containing this "Eun" element have been popular for newborn girls in South Korea, including:

First syllable

Masculine
Eun-ho
Eun-hoo
Eun-joon
Eun-kyu
Eun-min
Eun-woo

Unisex
Eun-jae
Eun-soo
Eun-sung
Eun-sang

Feminine
Eun-ah
Eun-bi
Eun-byul
Eun-chae
Eun-ha
Eun-hee
Eun-hye
Eun-ji, 2nd place in 1980
Eun-jin
Eun-ju, 6th place in 1970
Eun-jung, 3rd place in 1970, 6th place in 1980
Eun-kyung, 8th place in 1970
Eun-kyo
Eun-mi
Eun-seh
Eun-seo, 10th place in 2011, 2013
Eun-sook
Eun-sun
Eun-young, 5th place in 1970, 8th place in 1980

Second syllable
Masculine
Dae-eun
Dong-eun
Hyung-eun
Jong-eun

Unisex
Do-eun
Gi-eun
Jae-eun
Jung-eun
Kyu-eun
Rae-eun
Sang-eun
Seong-eun
Seung-eun
Tae-eun

Feminine
Chae-eun
Cho-eun
Da-eun
Ga-eun
Go-eun
Ha-eun, 7th place in 2008, 8th place in 2009 and 2011
Hae-eun
Hee-eun
Hye-eun
Hyo-eun
Ji-eun, 4th place in 1980, 2nd place in 1990
Jo-eun
Ju-eun
Kyo-eun
Kyung-eun
Mi-eun
Na-eun
Ra-eun
Se-eun
Seo-eun
Si-eun
So-eun
Ye-eun, 6th place in 2008 and 9th place in 2009
Yeo-eun
Yo-eun
Young-eun
Yu-eun

People with the single-syllable given name Eun (Un) include:

Yi Un (1897–1970), Joseon Dynasty prince 
Ko Un (born 1933), South Korean poet
Lee Eun (born 1961), South Korean film director
Eun Yang (born 1973), Korean American journalist

See also
List of Korean family names
List of Korean given names
List of South Korean surnames by prevalence

References

Korean given names
Korean-language surnames